Epydoc is a documentation generator that processes its own lightweight markup language Epytext for Python documentation strings. As opposed to freeform Python docstrings, reStructuredText (both also supported) and other markup languages for docstrings, Epytext supports linking between different pieces of documentation.  The project Epydoc is inactive since February 2009. Epydoc is released under the MIT license.

There are several tools for rendering Epytext. Most commonly, the epydoc program is used to render Epytext as a series of HTML documents for display on the Internet, or as a PDF document for printing. Epydoc also supports viewing the rendered documentation within Python using a GUI. The syntax is uncomplicated enough for the programmer to read the raw Epytext docstrings embedded in the source code directly.

See also

Comparison of documentation generators

External links
Epydoc website

Free documentation generators
Python (programming language) software
Lightweight markup languages